National Community Church (NCC) is a is a Pentecostal multi-site church located in the Washington, D.C. area, pastored by Mark Batterson. It is affiliated with the Assemblies of God USA. Weekly sermons are also available online as audio and video podcasts and on-demand webcasts.

History

National Community Church held its first Sunday service on January 7, 1996. During the first nine months of 1996, average attendance at Sunday services was between 20-25 people. At the time, all meetings were at the Joshua R. Giddings school in southeast Washington, DC, but the school was closed due to fire code violations.

NCC found a new home in the AMC Theatres at Union Station, holding its first services there on November 17, 1996. A second Sunday service was added in February 2001 when the church grew to 275 weekly attendees. In an August 2001 article in the Washington Post, the congregation was described as "young" and "casually dressed," and Batterson remarked that the church was "right in the middle of the marketplace."

In 2002, NCC purchased an abandoned building located one block from Union Station, which had been a one-story diner in the early twentieth century. In March 2006, after investing a few million dollars for renovation, NCC opened Ebenezers, a coffeehouse serving fair trade and organic coffee, with church offices located on the top floor and an event space in the basement. The basement of Ebenezer's became the regular venue for a Saturday worship service and the live taping of weekly sermons. In July 2008, Ebenezers was named the best coffeehouse in the Washington metropolitan area by AOL's City Guide.

In 2005, NCC began making its sermons available online via podcast.

The church expanded to movie theaters in Georgetown and Kingstowne, Virginia, and Sunday services were held at Ebenezer's when the movie theater at Union Station abruptly closed in October 2009. In 2010, NCC began a Sunday evening service at the GALA Hispanic Theatre in Columbia Heights, Washington, D.C. and a regular Sunday service in Potomac Yard in Virginia.

In 2011, NCC purchased a century-old theater on Barracks Row in Capitol Hill, which was originally known as Meader’s Theater and had been home to the People's Church since 1962. In March 2011, NCC's congregation totaled around 2,000, and the theater became the NCC's central site, hosting multiple Sunday services and the Saturday afternoon taping of the sermon distributed to the other six locations and online. Over the next several years, the theater was renovated and in May 2016 it opened to the public as a movie theater and performance venue, named the "Miracle Theatre."

After being featured in The Washington Post in 2012, the congregation at Union Station grew to over 500. NCC launched its second location in the Regal Entertainment Group theaters at Ballston Common Mall in Arlington, Virginia in 2003, using a pre-recorded video to present sermons in both locations on Sundays.

In 2012, NCC entered into a partnership with a community organization, the Southeast White House, to buy an abandoned apartment building in the Hillcrest neighborhood of Washington, D.C. The building was renovated into a community center with a dance studio, basketball court, art center, computer lab, and recording studio, opening in 2017 as the "DC Dream Center."

In 2014, NCC celebrated Easter with 800 congregants at the historic Lincoln Theatre on U Street in Washington, D.C. where the church established a new weekly Sunday service. In April 2014, NCC had over 3,000 congregants attending services in seven locations.

In 2014, NCC purchased the Navy Yard Car Barn, several blocks south of the Miracle Theatre on Barracks Row.

Affiliations
National Community Church is affiliated with the Assemblies of God USA and the Willow Creek Association.

References

External links
National Community Church
Mark Batterson
Ebenezers Coffeehouse
The Miracle Theater
DC Dream Center

Assemblies of God churches
Pentecostal churches in Washington, D.C.
Christian organizations established in 1996
1996 establishments in the United States